Etügen Eke ("Mother Earth", also transliterated variously as Itügen or Etügen Ekhe) is an earth goddess in Tengrism. She was believed to be perpetually virginal. The word "etugen" associates with woman and daughter of Kayra. Also her name may have originated from Ötüken, the holy mountain of the earth and fertility goddess of the ancient Turks. Medieval sources sometimes pair Etugen with a male counterpart named Natigai or Nachigai (Natikai, Natıkay), although this is probably a mistake based on a mispronunciation of Etugen. In mythology Etugen is often represented as a young woman riding a grey bull.

Mother Earth
Etugen existed in the middle of the Universe. The Turkic people depicted Etugen as a voluptuous, beautiful woman, who was patroness of the Homeland and nature. All living beings were subordinate to her. Therefore, the Turkic people viewed Etugen as the second highest deity, after Kök-Tengri. The dominant role in determining the fate of people and nations belonged to Tengri, but natural forces yielded to Etugen. Sometimes on Tengri's command, Etugen punished people for their sins. But she was generally considered a benevolent Goddess. To appease the goddess Etugen, sacrifices were made every spring in preparation for the cattle-breeding season and before planting crops. Sacrifices were also conducted in the autumn, after the completion of the harvest. During the times of the Khaganates, sacrifices to Etugen had a nationwide character. They were conducted near rivers and on the banks of lakes. A reddish horse was sacrificed with appeals for the fertility of cattle and crops, and for general well being.

References

Bibliography

External links
 Myfhology Info

See also
 Otukan
 Yer Tanry

Earth goddesses
Virgin goddesses
Religion in Mongolia
Mongolian deities
Turkic deities